The 2013 William Hill Grand Slam of Darts, was the seventh staging of the tournament, organised by the Professional Darts Corporation. The event took place from 9–17 November 2013 at the Wolverhampton Civic Hall, Wolverhampton, England.

Raymond van Barneveld was the defending champion, but he was eliminated in the group stage. The semi-final match between Phil Taylor and Adrian Lewis proved to be the highest quality in darts history as the players averaged 109.76 and 110.99 respectively, the highest combined average ever recorded. The PDC record of 31 maximums set in the 2007 World Championship final was broken as 32 were made in this match in 32 fewer legs. Taylor won the match 16–9 and went on to seal his fifth Grand Slam title by beating Robert Thornton 16–6 in the final.

Prize money

Qualifying

Qualifying tournaments
Players in italics had already qualified for the event.

PDC

BDO

Other qualifiers

Pools

Draw

Group stage

All matches first-to-5/best of 9
NB in Brackets: Number = Seeds; BDO = BDO Darts player; RQ = Ranking qualifier; Q = Qualifier
NB: P = Played; W = Won; L = Lost; LF = Legs for; LA = Legs against; +/- = Plus/minus record, in relation to legs; Average – 3-dart average; Pts = Points; Q = Qualified for K.O. phase

Group A

9 November

10 November

12 November

Group B

9 November

10 November

12 November

Group C

9 November

10 November

12 November

Group D

9 November

10 November

12 November

Group E

9 November

10 November

11 November

Group F

9 November

10 November

11 November

Group G

9 November

10 November

11 November

Group H

9 November

10 November

11 November

Nine-dart shootout
With Wes Newton and Mark Webster finishing level on points and leg difference, a nine-dart shootout between the two took place to see who would play Scott Waites in the second round. The match took place after the conclusion of Monday's group matches, and was the first time since the 2009 Grand Slam of Darts that a nine-dart shootout was required.

Knockout stage

Statistics
{|class="wikitable sortable" style="font-size: 95%; text-align: right"
|-
! Player
! Eliminated
! Played
! Legs Won
! Legs Lost
! LWAT
! 100+
! 140+
! 180s
! High checkout
! 3-dart average
|-
|align="left"|  Phil Taylor
| Winner
| 7
| 
| 
| 
| 
| 
| 
| 167
| 104.20
|-
|align="left"|  Robert Thornton
| Runner-up
| 7
| 
| 
| 
| 
| 
| 
| 161
| 95.34
|-
|align="left"|  Adrian Lewis
| Semi-finals
| 6
| 
| 
| 
| 
| 
| 
| 120
| 99.49
|-
|align="left"|  Scott Waites
| Semi-finals
| 6
| 
| 
| 
| 
| 
| 
| 146
| 92.63
|-
|align="left"|  Tony O'Shea
| Quarter-finals
| 5
| 
| 
| 
| 
| 
| 
| 123
| 96.47
|-
|align="left"|  Kim Huybrechts
| Quarter-finals
| 5
| 
| 
| 
| 
| 
| 
| 148
| 95.00
|-
|align="left"|  James Wade
| Quarter-finals
| 5
| 
| 
| 
| 
| 
| 
| 160
| 94.51
|-
|align="left"|  Ted Hankey
| Quarter-finals
| 5
| 
| 
| 
| 
| 
| 
| 170
| 87.14
|-
|align="left"|  Gary Anderson
| Second round
| 4
| 
| 
| 
| 
| 
| 
| 144
| 104.89
|-
|align="left"|  Simon Whitlock
| Second round
| 4
| 
| 
| 
| 
| 
| 
| 122
| 98.66
|-
|align="left"|  Michael van Gerwen
| Second round
| 4
| 
| 
| 
| 
| 
| 
| 135
| 96.41
|-
|align="left"|  Mervyn King
| Second round
| 4
| 
| 
| 
| 
| 
| 
| 141
| 95.78
|-
|align="left"|  Mark Webster
| Second round
| 4
| 
| 
| 
| 
| 
| 
| 164
| 93.97
|-
|align="left"|  Andy Hamilton
| Second round
| 4
| 
| 
| 
| 
| 
| 
| 136
| 93.75
|-
|align="left"|  Ronny Huybrechts
| Second round
| 4
| 
| 
| 
| 
| 
| 
| 108
| 92.23
|-
|align="left"|  Paul Nicholson
| Second round
| 4
| 
| 
| 
| 
| 
| 
| 125
| 88.71
|-
|align="left"|  Peter Wright
| Group stage
| 3
| 
| 
| 
| 
| 
| 
| 121
| 99.21
|-
|align="left"|  Dave Chisnall
| Group stage
| 3
| 
| 
| 
| 
| 
| 
| 97
| 95.84
|-
|align="left"|  Wes Newton
| Group stage
| 3
| 
| 
| 
| 
| 
| 
| 70
| 94.85
|-
|align="left"|  Wesley Harms
| Group stage
| 3
| 
| 
| 
| 
| 
| 
| 96
| 94.31
|-
|align="left"|  Ricky Evans
| Group stage
| 3
| 
| 
| 
| 
| 
| 
| 76
| 93.57
|-
|align="left"|  Raymond van Barneveld
| Group stage
| 3
| 
| 
| 
| 
| 
| 
| 96
| 93.02
|-
|align="left"|  Christian Kist
| Group stage
| 3
| 
| 
| 
| 
| 
| 
| 124
| 92.98
|-
|align="left"|  Justin Pipe
| Group stage
| 3
| 
| 
| 
| 
| 
| 
| 101
| 92.90
|-
|align="left"|  Dean Winstanley
| Group stage
| 3
| 
| 
| 
| 
| 
| 
| 91
| 92.77
|-
|align="left"|  Michael Smith
| Group stage
| 3
| 
| 
| 
| 
| 
| 
| 121
| 91.20
|-
|align="left"|  Stuart Kellett
| Group stage
| 3
| 
| 
| 
| 
| 
| 
| 78
| 90.54
|-
|align="left"|  Kevin Painter
| Group stage
| 3
| 
| 
| 
| 
| 
| 
| 116
| 88.14
|-
|align="left"|  Mark Walsh
| Group stage
| 3
| 
| 
| 
| 
| 
| 
| 101
| 87.52
|-
|align="left"|  Vincent van der Voort
| Group stage
| 3
| 
| 
| 
| 
| 
| 
| 80
| 86.51
|-
|align="left"|  Ross Smith
| Group stage
| 3
| 
| 
| 
| 
| 
| 
| 40
| 85.86
|-
|align="left"|  Richie George
| Group stage
| 3
| 
| 
| 
| 
| 
| 
| 80
| 83.37
|-

References

2013
Grand Slam
Grand Slam of Darts
Grand Slam of Darts